Edward Esko (October 16, 1950 – December 11, 2021) was an American advocate of macrobiotics. He lectured all over the world on diet, nutrition, holistic health, food and oriental cosmology.

Background 

Esko was born in Philadelphia, to Edward and Elizabeth Esko. He was educated at Abraham Lincoln High School and Temple University. In 1972, Esko began studies in Boston with macrobiotic educator, Michio Kushi. He served as Executive Director of Kushi's East West Foundation and Director of Education at the Kushi Institute.

He was the founder of the International Macrobiotic Institute (IMI) and served on the Board of Planetary Health, Inc., the non-profit sponsor of the Macrobiotic Summer Conference.

Esko has authored or edited over two-dozen books, and co-authored Macrobiotic Cooking for Everyone with his first wife, Wendy Esko. He lived in Pittsfield, Massachusetts with Naomi Ichikawa, his second wife and also a teacher of macrobiotics. Esko died aged 71 in Pittsfield.

Achievements 

 1973: Esko received an Author Award from the George Ohsawa Macrobiotic Foundation for a review of Two Great Indians in Japan by George Ohsawa.
 1999: The Smithsonian Institution's National Museum of American History opened a permanent collection on macrobiotics and alternative health care. The collection, titled “Michio and Aveline Kushi Macrobiotics Collection”, includes numerous books and articles written or edited by Edward Esko. It is located in the Archives Center.
 2002: Edward Esko joined the Preventive Medicine Center in Hartford, Connecticut as Director of Educational Services. 
 2017: Edward Esko founded the International Macrobiotic Institute to continue the work of Michio Kushi and George Ohsawa.
 2017: Esko co-founded the Macrobiotic Summer Conference in 2017 at Eastover Resort in Lenox, Massachusetts.

Books 

 1979 Natural Healing through Macrobiotics (with Michio Kushi). Japan Publications; 
 1980 Macrobiotic Cooking for Everyone. Japan Publications; 
 1986 Macrobiotic Child Care and Family Health (with Michio Kushi). Japan Publications; 
 1988 Doctors Look at Macrobiotics (edited). Japan Publications; 
 1991 The Macrobiotic Approach to Cancer (with Michio Kushi). Garden City Park. 
 1992 Heilung des Planeten Erde. Ost West Bund Verlag; 
 1993 Holistic Health through Macrobiotics (with Michio Kushi). Japan Publications; 
 2012 Contemporary Macrobiotics. Amberwaves Press; 
 2012 Yin Yang Primer. Amberwaves Press; 
 2014 Rice Field Essays. Amberwaves Press; 
 2016 Dandelion Essays. Amberwaves Press; 
 2017 One Peaceful Universe. IMI Press; 
 2017 Macrobiotics. IMI Press; 
 2017 What is Macrobiotics? IMI Press; 
 2017 Macrobiotics: Food for Peace. IMI Press 
 2018 Macrobiotic Nutrition. IMI Press; 
 2018 Baseball Feng Shui. IMI Press;

References

External links 

 International Macrobiotic Institute

1950 births
2021 deaths
American cookbook writers
Educators from Philadelphia
Macrobiotic diet advocates